For people with the surname, see Barsi (surname).

Barsi is a city in Bawani Khera sub-district of Bhiwani district in Haryana, India. , the village had 4,474 households with a population of 23,327 of which 12,423 were male and 10,904 female.

References

Villages in Bhiwani district